The 2014–15 1. FSV Mainz 05 season is the 110th season in the club's football history. In 2014–15, the club competed in the Bundesliga, the top tier of German football. It is the club's sixth consecutive season in this league, having been promoted from the 2. Bundesliga at the conclusion of the 2008–09 season.

In the previous season, Mainz 05 finished in seventh place, thus qualifying for the UEFA Europa League third qualifying round.

First team squad
As of 1 September 2014

Out on loan

Transfers

In

Out

Competitions

Bundesliga

League table

Results summary

Results by round

Matches

DFB-Pokal

UEFA Europa League

Third qualifying round

Statistics

Goalscorers
This includes all competitive matches.  The list is sorted by shirt number when total goals are equal.

† denotes players that left the club during the season 
Last updated on 24 September 2014

References

Mainz 05
1. FSV Mainz 05 seasons
Mainz 05